Kobus may refer to:

Kobus (given name)
Kobus (surname)
Kobus (antelope), a genus of antelopes
Kobus!, South African metal band and  their self-titled debut album
Magnolia kobus, a species of plant

See also